Berisha may refer to:
 Berisha (region)
 Berisha (tribe)
 Berisha (surname)

See also
 Belisha (disambiguation)
 Belushi (disambiguation)